The NAIA Division II women's basketball championship  is the former tournament held by the NAIA to determine the national champion of women's college basketball among its Division II members in the United States and Canada.

The tournament was held annually from 1992 to 2019, after which the NAIA consolidated its two divisions, returning to the single national championship for men's and women's basketball that it held between 1981 and 1991. The last separate Division II tournament was scheduled for 2020, but it was ultimately cancelled due to the COVID-19 pandemic, thus making the 2019 the last completed event.

Over its twenty-eight year history, the tournament was played in three different cities and at four different venues. Unlike the NCAA's annual basketball tournaments, where games are played at an assortment of regional sites over the course of several weeks, all NAIA tournament games were played at a single, centralized arena. 

Northwestern College had the most national titles with five.

Morningside College, the 2015 champion, had the second most national titles with three. Northwestern also had the most tournament championship game appearances, with six.

Results

Champions

Division I titles are not included in this list. Schools in italics are no longer in the NAIA.

 Schools highlight in yellow have reclassified athletics from the NAIA.

See also
NAIA Division I Women's Basketball Championship
NAIA Division I Men's Basketball Championship
NAIA Division II Men's Basketball Championship
NCAA Division I women's basketball tournament
NCAA Division II women's basketball tournament
NCAA Division III women's basketball tournament

References

NAIA Women's Basketball Championships